The Port of Missing Men is a lost 1914 silent film drama directed by Francis Powers and starring Arnold Daly. It is based on a novel by Meredith Nicholson.

Cast
Arnold Daly - John Armitage
Marguerite Skirvin - Shirley claiborne
Edward MacKay - Frederick Augustus
Frederick Bock - Emperor Charles Louis
Augustus Balfour - Archduke Karl
Minna Gale Haynes - Archduchess
Mortimer Martine - Ferdinand von Stroebel
Arthur Hale - Francis
David Wall - Jules Chauvenel
Wallace Scott - Richard Claiborne
Fred Webber - Judge Claiborne

References

External links

1914 films
American silent feature films
Lost American films
Films based on American novels
Famous Players-Lasky films
American black-and-white films
Silent American drama films
1914 drama films
1914 lost films
Lost drama films
1910s American films